Laurelton may refer to:

Laurelton, Queens, New York City
Laurelton, New Jersey
Laurelton, Pennsylvania
Laurelton Hall, Long Island, New York